Gregory Dodds was Dean of Exeter between 1560 and 1570. He had been prior of Cambridge Blackfriars at its dissolution.

Notes

Deans of Exeter